
Gmina Prostki is a rural gmina (administrative district) in Ełk County, Warmian-Masurian Voivodeship, in northern Poland.

Villages
Gmina Prostki contains the villages and settlements of Bobry, Bogusze, Borki, Bzury, Ciernie, Cisy, Czyprki, Dąbrowskie, Długochorzele, Długosze, Dybówko, Dybowo, Glinki, Gorczyce, Guty Rożyńskie, Jebramki, Katarzynowo, Kibisy, Kobylin, Kobylinek, Kopijki, Kosinowo, Krupin, Krzywe, Krzywińskie, Kurczątki, Lipińskie Małe, Marchewki, Miechowo, Miłusze, Niedźwiedzkie, Nowaki, Olszewo, Ostrykół, Popowo, Prostki, Różyńsk Wielki, Sokółki, Sołtmany, Taczki, Wiśniowo Ełckie, Wojtele, Zawady-Tworki and Żelazki.

Neighbouring gminas
Gmina Prostki is bordered by the town of Grajewo and by the gminas of Biała Piska, Ełk, Grajewo, Kalinowo, Rajgród and Szczuczyn.

References

 Polish official population figures 2006

Prostki
Ełk County